WNDI (AM) & WNDI-FM are simulcasting radio stations broadcasting on the frequencies of 1550 kilohertz and 95.3 megahertz. WNDI AM&FM are owned by the JTM Broadcasting Corporation.

The format is Country music and the stations are located in the city of Sullivan, Indiana.

References

External links
WNDI Facebook

NDI (AM)
Country radio stations in the United States